The Romanian Music Awards, or simply RMA, are a Romanian annual event awarding the best artists in Romania's music scene. It is organized by Music Channel Romania and has taken place in various locations in the country. It was held from 2002 until 2014, and returned in 2022.

Locations

As MTV Romania Music Awards (2003–07) 
 June 5, 2003 – Polyvalent Hall, Bucharest
 June 3, 2004 – Palace Hall, Bucharest
 April 23, 2005 – Palace Hall, Bucharest
 June 3, 2006 – Horia Demian Sports Hall, Cluj-Napoca
 May 10, 2007 – Grand Square, Sibiu

As Romanian Music Awards (2008–14) 
 October 5, 2008 – Palace of Culture, Iași
 June 6, 2009 – Prefecture Square, Craiova
 July 10, 2010 – Prefecture Square, Craiova
 September 16, 2011 – Council Square, Brașov
 June 8, 2012 – Prefecture Square, Craiova
 September 14, 2013 – Council Square, Brașov
 September 12, 2014 – Council Square, Brașov
 September 22, 2022 – Râmnicu Vâlcea

See also
 Music Channel Romania

References

External links
 Music Channel Romania official website

Romanian music awards
Music video awards